The Raspberry Ripple Awards was an awards show broadcast in 1997 to celebrate (and sometimes ridicule) the representation of disabled people in the media. The idea, formulated by the 1 in 8 Group and produced by Kudos Productions was made for Channel 4.

Synopsis 
The Raspberry Ripple Awards were designed to recognise the inclusivity of disabled people within the media industry. Actor Alan Cumming presented the awards on the night. The awards ranged from radio to theatre, Children's television to Factual television. They also gave out awards to the worst portrayals, highlighting the ways that media companies should not address disability. Cumming said the words "...could not be here tonight..." to rapturous laughter and applause, although on some occasions did invite surprise guests linked to that production to the stage to catch them off guard.

Winners

References 

Award ceremonies in the United Kingdom